Pool B of the 2016 Fed Cup Americas Zone Group I was one of two pools in the Americas zone of the 2016 Fed Cup. Four teams competed in a round robin competition, with the top team and the bottom two teams proceeding to their respective sections of the play-offs: the top team played for advancement to the World Group II Play-offs, while the bottom two teams faced potential relegation to Group II.

Standings

Round-robin

Argentina vs. Ecuador

Brazil vs. Peru

Argentina vs. Peru

Brazil vs. Ecuador

Argentina vs. Brazil

Ecuador vs. Peru

References

External links 
 Fed Cup website

2016 Fed Cup Americas Zone